Lithium iron phosphate or lithium ferro-phosphate (LFP) is an inorganic compound with the formula . It is a gray, red-grey, brown or black solid that is insoluble in water. The material has attracted attention as a component of lithium iron phosphate batteries, a type of Li-ion battery.  This battery chemistry is targeted for use in power tools, electric vehicles, solar energy installations and more recently large grid-scale energy storage.

Most lithium batteries (Li-ion) used in consumer electronics products use cathodes made of other lithium compounds, such as lithium cobalt oxide, lithium manganese oxide, and lithium nickel oxide. The anodes are generally made of graphite.

Lithium iron phosphate exists naturally in the form of the mineral triphylite, but this material has insufficient purity for use in batteries.

M includes not only Fe but also Co, Mn and Ti. However, more than one olivine-type phase may be used as a battery's cathode material. All may be referred to as “LFP”.

Manganese, phosphate, iron, and lithium also form an olivine structure. This structure is a useful contributor to the cathode of lithium rechargeable batteries. This is due to the olivine structure created when lithium is combined with manganese, iron, and phosphate (as described above). The olivine structures of lithium rechargeable batteries are significant, for they are affordable, stable, and can be safely used to store energy.

History and production
Arumugam Manthiram and John B. Goodenough first identified the polyanion class of cathode materials for lithium ion batteries.  was then identified as a cathode material belonging to the polyanion class for use in batteries in 1996 by Padhi et al. Neutron diffraction confirmed that LFP was able to ensure the security of large input/output current of lithium batteries.

The material can be produced by heating a variety of iron and lithium salts with phosphates or phosphoric acid.  Many related routes have been described including those that use hydrothermal synthesis.

Physical and chemical properties
In , lithium has a +1 charge, iron +2 charge balancing the −3 charge for phosphate.  Upon removal of Li, the material converts to the ferric form .

The phosphate groups, are tetrahedral. The three-dimensional framework is formed by the  octahedra sharing O corners. Lithium ions reside within the octahedral channels in a zigzag manner. In crystallography, this structure is thought to belong to the Pmnb space group of the orthorhombic crystal system. The lattice constants are: a = 6.008 Å, b = 10.334 Å, and c = 4.693 Å. The volume of the unit cell is 291.4 Å3.

During charge/discharge, the lithium ions are extracted concomitant with oxidation of Fe:
LiFe^{II}PO4 <=> Fe^{III}PO4 + Li+ + e-

Extraction of lithium from  produces  with a similar structure.  adopts a Pmnb space group with a unit cell volume of 272.4 Å3, only slightly smaller than that of its lithiated precursor. Extraction of lithium ions reduces the lattice volume, as is the case with lithium oxides. 's corner-shared  octahedra are separated by the oxygen atoms of the  tetrahedra and cannot form a continuous  network, reducing conductivity.

A nearly close-packed hexagonal array of oxides centers provides relatively little free volume for  ions to migrate within. Two phases of the lithiated material are implicated.

Applications

LFP cells have an operating voltage of 3.3 V, charge density of 170 mAh/g, high power density, long cycle life and stability at high temperatures.

LFP's major commercial advantages are that it poses few safety concerns such as overheating and explosion, as well as long cycle lifetimes, high power density and has a wider operating temperature range. Power plants and automobiles use LFP.

BAE has announced that their HybriDrive Orion 7 hybrid bus uses about 180 kW LFP battery cells.  AES has developed multi-trillion watt battery systems that are capable of subsidiary services of the power network, including spare capacity and frequency adjustment.  In China, BAK and Tianjin Lishen are active in the area.

Comparison 
Although LFP has 25% less specific charge (Ah/g) than lithium batteries with oxide (e.g. nickel-cobalt-manganese, NCM)  cathode materials due to its operational voltage (3.2 volts vs 3.7 for NCM-type cathode chemistries), it has 70% more than nickel-hydrogen batteries.

The major differences between LFP batteries and other lithium ion battery types is that LFP batteries contain no cobalt (removing ethical and economic questions about cobalt's availability) and have a flat discharge curve.

LFP batteries have drawbacks, originating from a high electronic resistivity of LFP, as well as the lower maximum charge/discharge voltage.

Lithium cobalt oxide based battery chemistries are more prone to thermal runaway if overcharged and cobalt is both expensive and not widely geographically available. Other chemistries such as nickel-manganese-cobalt (NMC) have supplanted LiCo chemistry cells in most applications. The original ratio of Ni to Mn to Co was 3:3:3, whereas today, cells are being made with ratios of 8:1:1 or 6:2:2, whereby the Co content has been drastically reduced.

LiFePO4 batteries are comparable to sealed lead acid batteries and are often being touted as a drop-in replacement for lead acid applications. The most notable difference between lithium iron phosphate and lead acid is the fact that the lithium battery capacity shows only a small dependence on the discharge rate. With very high discharge rates, for instance 0.8C, the capacity of the lead acid battery is only 60% of the rated capacity. Therefore, in cyclic applications where the discharge rate is often greater than 0.1C, a lower rated lithium battery will often have a higher actual capacity than the comparable lead acid battery. This means that at the same capacity rating, the lithium will cost more, but a lower capacity lithium battery can be used for the same application at a lower price. The cost of ownership when considering the lifecycle further increases the value of the lithium battery when compared to a lead acid battery.

Intellectual property
The root patents of LFP compounds are held by four organizations. University of Texas-Austin for the discovery of the material. Hydro-Québec, Université de Montréal and the French National Center for Scientific Research (CNRS) for the carbon coating that enhance its conductivity and actually makes LFP suitable for industrial developments. These patents underlie mature mass production technologies. The largest production capacity is up to 250 tons per month.

The special feature of  • zM from Aleees a high capacitance and low impedance obtained by the stable control of the ferrites and crystal growth. This improved control is realized by applying strong mechanical stirring forces to the precursors in high oversaturation states, which induces crystallization of the metal oxides and LFP.

The patent claims involved a unique crystal structure and a chemical formula of the battery cathode material.

On April 7, 2006, A123 filed an action seeking a declaration of non-infringement and invalidity UT's patents. A123 separately filed two ex parte Reexamination Proceedings before the United States Patent and Trademark Office (USPTO), in which they sought to invalidate the patents based upon prior art.

In a parallel court proceeding, UT sued Valence Technology, Inc. ("Valence") - a company that commercializes LFP products that alleged infringement.

The USPTO issued a Reexamination Certificate for the '382 patent on April 15, 2008, and for the '640 patent on May 12, 2009, by which the claims of these patents were amended. This allowed the current patent infringement suits filed by Hydro-Quebec against Valence and A123 to proceed. After a Markman hearing, on April 27, 2011, the Western District Court of Texas held that the claims of the reexamined patents had a narrower scope than as originally granted.
The key question was whether the earlier Goodenough's patents from the University of Texas (licensed to Hydro-Quebec) were infringed by A123, that had its own improved versions of LiFePO4 patents, that contained cobalt dopant. The end results was licensing of Googenough's patents by A123 under undisclosed terms.

On December 9, 2008, the European Patent Office revoked Dr. Goodenough’s patent numbered 0904607. This decision basically reduced the patent risk of using LFP in European automobile applications. The decision is believed to be based on the lack of novelty.

The first major large settlement was the lawsuit between NTT and the University of Texas-Austin (UT). In October 2008, NTT announced that they would settle the case in the Japan Supreme Civil Court for $30 million. As part of the agreement, UT agreed that NTT did not steal the information and that NTT would share its LFP patents with UT. At the heart of the case was that NTT engineer Okada Shigeto, who had worked in the UT labs developing the material, was accused of stealing UT’s intellectual property.

As of 2020, an organization named LifePO+C claims to own the key IP and offers licenses. It is a consortium between Johnson Matthey, the CNRS, University of Montreal, and Hydro Quebec.

Research

Power density 
LFP has two shortcomings: low conductivity (high overpotential) and low lithium diffusion constant, both of which limit the charge/discharge rate. Adding conducting particles in delithiated  raises its electron conductivity. However, addition of conductive additives also increases the "dead mass" present in the cell that does not contribute to energy storage.  shows good cycling performance even under charge/discharge current as large as 5C.

Stability 
Coating LFP with inorganic oxides can make LFP’s structure more stable and increase conductivity. Traditional  with oxide coating shows improved cycling performance. This coating also inhibits dissolution of Co and slows the decay of  capacity. The addition of a conductive carbon increases efficiency. Mitsui Zosen and Aleees reported that addition of conducting metal particles such as copper and silver increased efficiency.  with 1 wt% of metal additives has a reversible capacity up to 140 mAh/g and better efficiency under high discharge current.

Metal substitution
Substituting other metals for the iron or lithium in  can also raise efficiency. Substituting zinc for iron increases crystallinity of  because zinc and iron have similar ionic radii. Cyclic voltammetry confirms that , after metal substitution, has higher reversibility of lithium ion insertion and extraction. During lithium extraction, Fe (II) is oxidized to Fe (III) and the lattice volume shrinks. The shrinking volume changes lithium’s returning paths.

Synthesis processes
Mass production with stability and high quality still faces many challenges.

Similar to lithium oxides,  may be synthesized by a variety of methods, including: solid-phase synthesis, emulsion drying, sol-gel process, solution coprecipitation, vapor-phase deposition, electrochemical synthesis, electron beam irradiation, microwave process, hydrothermal synthesis, ultrasonic pyrolysis and spray pyrolysis.

In the emulsion drying process, the emulsifier is first mixed with kerosene. Next, the solutions of lithium salts and iron salts are added to this mixture. This process produces nanocarbon particles. Hydrothermal synthesis produces  with good crystallinity. Conductive carbon is obtained by adding polyethylene glycol to the solution followed by thermal processing. Vapor phase deposition produces a thin film . In flame spray pyrolysis FePO4 is mixed with lithium carbonate and glucose and charged with electrolytes. The mixture is then injected inside a flame and filtered to collect the synthesized .

Effects of temperature
The effects of temperature on lithium iron phosphate batteries can be divided into the effects of high temperature and low temperature.

Generally, LFP chemistry batteries are less susceptible to thermal runaway reactions like those that occur in lithium cobalt batteries; LFP batteries exhibit better performance at an elevated temperature. Research has shown that at room temperature (23 °C), the initial capacity loss approximates 40-50 mAh/g. However, at 40 °C and 60 °C, the capacity losses approximate 25 and 15 mAh/g respectively, but these capacity losses were spread over 20 cycles instead of a bulk loss like that in the case of room temperature capacity loss.

However, this is only true for a short cycling timeframe. Later yearlong study has shown that despite LFP batteries having double the equivalent full cycle, the capacity fate rate increased with increasing temperature for LFP cells but the increasing temperature does not impact NCA cells or have a negligible impact on the aging of NMC cells. This capacity fade is primarily due to the solid electrolyte interface (SEI) formation reaction being accelerated by increasing temperature.

LFP batteries are especially affected by decreasing temperature which possibly hamper their application in high-latitude areas. The initial discharge capacities for LFP/C samples at temperatures of 23, 0, -10, and -20 °C are 141.8, 92.7, 57.9 and 46.7 mAh/g with coulombic efficiency 91.2%, 74.5%, 63.6% and 61.3%. These losses are accounted for by the slow diffusion of lithium ions within electrodes and the formation of SEI that come with lower temperatures which subsequently increase the charge-transfer resistance on the electrolyte-electrode interfaces. Another possible cause of the lowered capacity formation is lithium plating. As mentioned above, low temperature lowers the diffusion rate of lithium ions within the electrodes, allowing for the lithium plating rate to compete with that of intercalation rate. The colder condition leads to higher growth rates and shifts the initial point to lower state of charge which means that the plating process starts earlier. Lithium plating uses up lithium which then compete with the intercalation of lithium into graphite, decreasing the capacity of the batteries. The aggregated lithium ions are deposited on the surface of electrodes in the form of “plates” or even dendrites which may penetrate the separators, short-circuiting the battery completely.

See also
Lithium iron phosphate battery
A123 Systems
Valence Technology

References

Lithium compounds
Iron(II) compounds
Phosphates
Rechargeable batteries